Olivier Girault (born February 22, 1973 in Pointe-à-Pitre, Guadeloupe) is a now retired French team handball player, who is currently the coach of the Paris Handball team. He retired as a field player in 2008 after the victory of the France men's national handball team (of which he was the captain) at the Beijing Olympics.

He won all three major championships with the national team: world championship in 2001, European championship in 2006 and olympic champion in 2008, as mentioned above.

He also regularly works as a commentator and consultant on sports events for France Télévisions.

He was the president of National Handball League from 2018 till 2020.

Clubs 

 Vaires-sur-Marne
 Livry-Gargan handball
 Massy Essonne HB
 CD Bidasoa
 Paris Handball

Honors 
 Club
 2007 : Winner of French Cup
 2008 : 2nd of the French Cup

 National team
 World Cup : 2001
 European Men's Handball Championship : 2006

External links 
 Olivier Girault on the French Handball Federation website 

1973 births
Living people
French male handball players
Guadeloupean male handball players
Olympic handball players of France
Handball players at the 2000 Summer Olympics
Handball players at the 2004 Summer Olympics
Handball players at the 2008 Summer Olympics
Olympic gold medalists for France
French people of Guadeloupean descent
Olympic medalists in handball
Medalists at the 2008 Summer Olympics
European champions for France
French expatriate sportspeople in Spain